Kurt Van Dooren (born 3 August 1978) is a Belgian football player currently playing for K.S.K. Heist.

Honours

Club
Beerschot A.C.
 Belgian Cup: 2004–05

References

Guardian Football

1978 births
Living people
Belgian footballers
K. Berchem Sport players
Beerschot A.C. players
Lierse S.K. players
Belgian Pro League players
Challenger Pro League players
K.S.K. Heist players
People from Brasschaat
Association football defenders
Footballers from Antwerp Province